"Freedom" is a song by American rock band Rage Against the Machine, released as the fourth and final single from their self-titled album in 1994.

"Freedom" was used in an episode of the MTV series Daria, entitled "Quinn The Brain" in 1998.

Music video
The video for "Freedom" was directed by Peter Christopherson and produced by Fiz Oliver at Squeak Pictures. It premiered on MTV's 120 Minutes on December 19, 1993. According to CVC Broadcast & Cable Top 50 chart, "Freedom" was the Number 1 promo in January 1994.

The video is focused on the case for Leonard Peltier, who was one of the leaders of the American Indian Movement (AIM). The band is performing live in a small venue throughout the video. During the video, footage from the Peltier case is examined and detailed with shots of Peltier and other members of AIM. There is also a reenactment of what took place on the Pine Ridge Indian Reservation. The footage of this reenactment is from Michael Apted's 1992 documentary Incident at Oglala.

During most of the video quotes from Sitting Bull and general AIM information taken from Peter Matthiessen's 1983 study of the Peltier case, In the Spirit of Crazy Horse, scrolls along the bottom of the screen. The video ends with a picture of Peltier in prison and the phrase "justice has not been done".

Track listing
"Freedom"
"Freedom" (Live)
"Take the Power Back" (Live)

See also
 List of anti-war songs

Rage Against the Machine songs
1994 singles
1992 songs
Epic Records singles
Song recordings produced by Garth Richardson
Songs written by Tom Morello
Songs written by Brad Wilk
Songs written by Tim Commerford
Songs written by Zack de la Rocha
Songs about freedom
Songs against capitalism